Said Aweys Ali (born 1 January 2000) is a Somali footballer who plays as a goalkeeper for Mogadishu City Club.

Club career
Ali began his career at Somali First Division club Waxool, before joining Banadir in 2018, who were renamed to Mogadishu City Club the following season.

International career
On 5 September 2019, Ali made his debut for Somalia, keeping a clean sheet in a 1–0 win against Zimbabwe. The win marked Somalia's first ever FIFA World Cup qualification victory.

References

2000 births
Living people
Association football goalkeepers
Somalian footballers
Somalia international footballers